The Islamic University of Madinah was founded by the government of Saudi Arabia by a royal decree in 1961 in the Islamic holy city of Medina. Many have associated the university with the Salafi ideology, and have stated it has exported Salafi-inclined theologians around the world. Others disagree and state that the institution is objective and scientific, being detached to any singular ideology. The university received institutional academic accreditation without exceptions from the National Commission for Academic Accreditation and Assessment in April 2017.

This university is designated only for Muslim male students.

Islamic science colleges 
University students may study Sharia, Qur'an, Usul al-din and Hadith, while non-native speakers may also study Arabic language. The university offers Bachelor of Arts, Master's and Doctorate degrees. Studies at the College of Sharia Islamic law were the first to start when the university opened. It offers scholarship programs for students with accommodation and living expenses covered.

Recently added colleges 
In 2009, the university opened a Faculty of Engineering. In 2011 the university opened a Faculty of Computer and Information Science. In 2012, the university opened a Faculty of Science for the first time. In 2019, the university announced that it would open a faculty of Judiciary Studies.

Online degrees 
In 2019, the university announced that it would begin to offer online degrees through a new e-learning and distance education program. The university currently offers an online bachelor of arts in Sharia and a certificate-granting program in Arabic language for non-native speakers.

Alumni

 Abdur Razzaq Iskander
 Hidayat Nur Wahid – Chairman of the Indonesian People’s Consultative Assembly (2004-2009), Islamic scholar with pluralistic view.
Mufti Menk - Zimbabwean Islamic Scholar.
Muqbil bin Hadi al-Wadi'i
Rabee al-Madkhali
Mishary Rashid Alafasy
Yasir Qadhi
Bilal Philips
Sajjad Nomani
Jusuf Barčić, Bosnian Salafist
Ja'afar Mahmud Adam. Nigerian Islamic Scholar

See also
 List of universities in Saudi Arabia

References

External links
 Official University Website (English and Arabic)
 Official Website of The University's British Students (English)

 
Islamic universities and colleges in Saudi Arabia
Educational institutions established in 1961
1961 establishments in Saudi Arabia
Universities and colleges in Saudi Arabia
Salafi Islamic universities and colleges